A pejorative or slur is a word or grammatical form expressing a negative or a disrespectful connotation, a low opinion, or a lack of respect toward someone or something. It is also used to express criticism, hostility, or disregard. Sometimes, a term is regarded as pejorative in some social or ethnic groups but not in others, or may be originally pejorative but later adopt a non-pejorative sense (or vice versa) in some or all contexts.

Etymology

Pejoration and melioration 

In historical linguistics, the process of an inoffensive word becoming pejorative is a form of semantic drift known as pejoration. An example of pejoration is the shift in meaning of the word silly from meaning that a person was happy and fortunate to meaning that they are foolish and unsophisticated. The process of pejoration can repeat itself around a single concept, leaping from word to word in a phenomenon known as the euphemism treadmill, for example as in the successive pejoration of the terms bog-house, privy-house, latrine, water closet, toilet, bathroom and restroom (US English).

When a term begins as pejorative and eventually is adopted in a non-pejorative sense, this is called melioration or amelioration. One example is the shift in meaning of the word nice from meaning a person was foolish to meaning that a person is pleasant. When performed deliberately, it is described as reclamation or reappropriation. An example of a word that has been reclaimed by portions of the community that it targets is queer, which began being re-appropriated as a positive descriptor in the early 1990s by activist groups. However, due to its history and – in some regions – continued use as a pejorative, there remain LGBT individuals who are uncomfortable with having this term applied to them. The "-a" use of the n-word by black americans is often viewed as another act of reclamation, though much like queer in the LGBT movement, there exist a vocal subsect of black people that object to the use of the n-word under any circumstances.

See also

 Approbative
 Defamation
 Dysphemism
 Fighting words
 Graphic pejoratives in written Chinese
 Insult
 Judgmental language
 List of ethnic slurs
 List of religious slurs
 Profanity

References

Further reading

External links

Bullying
Connotation
Criticism
Prejudice and discrimination